The Arco delle Due Porte or Arch of Two Doors is one of the remaining portals in the 11th century walls of Siena. It has been variously called the Porta di Stalloreggi with the gates known as San Quirico, Santa Margherita, and the Arco di Santa Lucia. It was the entrance into the southwesternmost end of Via Stalloreggi in Siena, region of Tuscany, Italy. Outside of the portal, in the Piazetta dell Due Porte are a confluence of streets: Via Fosso di Sant'Ansano flows south, Via Paolo Mascagni flows west, and Pian dei Mantellini flows south.  Via Mascagni leads down the slope some 200 meters to the 13th-century gate: Porta Laterina. Pian dei Mantellini lead to the church and convent del Carmine.

History
One of the arches has been walled, likely soon after the 13th-century expansion of the walls.

A tabernacle facing the piazza, to the left of the walled-up arch, now shelters behind glass the remains of a Madonna and Child, attributed to either Duccio or one of his followers. The fragment was part of a larger fresco that once included patron saints of Siena. Another Tabernacle stands aside the inner arch of the gate. A plaque on the wall of a house just inside the gate claims Duccio painted his famous Maesta in that house.

Bibliography
Toscana. Guida d'Italia (Guida rossa), Touring Club Italiano, Milano 2003. 

Gates of Siena
Buildings and structures completed in the 12th century